Tests is an album by The Microphones. It was first released as a cassette tape on Knw-Yr-Own in 1998. A CD release by Elsinor followed in the same year, but the track listing was a mixture of The Microphones's three previous albums: Microphone, Wires and Cords, and the Tests cassette. Most of the material was recorded at The Business while Elverum worked there.

Tests was re-issued on cassette in an edition of 20 by P.W. ELVERUM & SUN, ltd. The re-issue was to celebrate Record Store Day 2011 and was only available at The Business in Anacortes, WA.  A few additional copies were sold online via P.W. ELVERUM & SUN, ltd.

Track listing

Cassette 
Side A
 "Microphone Part 2"
 "Tests" (Phil version)
 "Feedback Love"
 "Bomb on Tape Deck Mt."
 "Tape Deck Ghost"
 "Bass Leftovers"
 "Like A Piranha"
 "Assault on Tape Deck Mt."
 "Spy Cameras"
 "Drums That No One Played / El Nino"
 "Death on Tape Deck Mt."
 "The Last Night of the Year"

Side B
 "PreAmp"
 "Rebirth on Tape Deck Mt."
 "Eyes for Volume"
 "Quiet Groove"
 "OH ANNA"
 "Summer Electricity"
 "Little Songs"
 "Anacortes Has a Secret Love"
 "Night Time, Then Sleep"

CD 
 "Tests" – 1:36
 "Feedback Love" – 2:46
 "Tape Deck Ghost" – 3:22
 "Like a Piranha" – 4:05
 "Soundwaves" – 3:01
 "Drums That No One Played / El Nino" – 2:22
 "Anacortes Has a Secret Love" – 3:11
 "Oh Anna" – 3:20
 "Spy Cameras" – 3:37
 "Witch Doctor" – 2:35
 "Monsters" – 3:49
 "The Last Night of the Year" – 4:54
 "PreAmp" – 2:29
 "Quiet Groove" – 2:59
 "Little Songs" – 4:18
 "Microphone Pt. 1" – 2:02
 "Microphone Pt. 2" – 2:23
 "Eyes for Volume" – 2:43
 "Wires and Cords" – 6:35

References 

The Microphones albums
1998 albums